Villalpando is a municipality located in the province of Zamora, Castile and León, Spain. According to the 2004 census (INE), the municipality has a population of 1,624 inhabitants.

Formerly the town was reputed for its saltpans, the Salinas de Villalpando.

See also
Tierra de Campos
Province of Zamora
Kingdom of León

References

External links

 De Intercatia a Villalpando
Tourism in Zamora

Municipalities of the Province of Zamora